Region is a term used by contemporary geographers to describe an area of land or water that is part of a larger whole.

Region or Regional may also refer to:

Transportation
RegionsAir, an airline based in the United States
Regional airline, any airline that services a limited area, or any of several specific regional airlines, including
 Régional (2001-2013), a defunct airline based in France
 Regional Airlines (France) (?-2001), a defunct airline based in France
Regional Air (Papua New Guinea), an airline based in Papua New Guinea
 Regional Air (Kenya) (2000-2005), a defunct airline based in Kenya
 Regional Air (est. 1997), an airline based in Tanzania
Regional Express Airlines, an airline based in Australia
 Regional 1 (airline) (2003-2019), an airline based in Canada
Regional Pacific Airlines, a defunct airline based in Australia

Regional is also the name of at least two rail lines:
Regional Railways one of the three former passenger sectors of British Rail from 1981 to 1996
Regional (Amtrak), a train line that runs between Massachusetts and Virginia

Computer science
 Region (model checking), a convex polytope data structure
 Region-based memory management, a memory management technique in which allocations are organized into regions and all objects in a region can be deallocated at once
 In raster graphics, a region is a data structure used to represent an arbitrary set of pixels (in Apple QuickDraw) or series of shapes (Microsoft Windows Graphics Device Interface or X Window System) to be drawn on the screen
 In digital audio editing, a region is a reference to a portion of an audio file

Mathematics and physics
Region (mathematical analysis), a non-empty, open, connected set

Corporations
Regions Financial Corporation, a banking and financial services company headquartered in Birmingham, Alabama

Politics
Region (administrative), a governmental subdivision of a nation
Region (Europe), a political subdivision within the European Union

Fiction
 Regional novel, see
 American Literary Regionalism
 British regional literature

Media
DVD region code
Blu-ray Region code